Far Cry is a 2008 English-language German action film loosely adapted from the video game of the same name. The film is directed by Uwe Boll and stars Til Schweiger. It was a major box-office bomb and received negative reviews.

Plot
In a remote jungle at nighttime, a mercenary squad is shown tracking down several escaped test subjects, only to be slaughtered by a lone mutant. Their employer, Dr. Krieger, is informed about the event and is asked to stop his research, Krieger refusing to do so. The film then skips to Valerie Cardinal, an American journalist who is secretly receiving information about the events and the truth about Krieger's research by an informant. She agrees to meet with him in person on a remote South Asian island to receive the rest.

To get to the island, Valerie hires skipper Jack Carver, a retired special forces operative, to take her to the island. During the trip, she reveals to Jack that her informant is her uncle, Max, who she claims served with Jack; Jack denies having ever known him. Jack's boat reaches the island. However, it turns out that Krieger's mercenaries caught Max and forced him to reveal the meeting location. Valerie is captured and the boat is destroyed, though Jack manages to escape. Jack steals a gun from a nearby guard after knocking him out and rescues Valerie. He insists that they leave the island, though Valerie refuses to leave without Max.

They hijack a mercenary vehicle and proceed to their main compound, where they are captured once again. Jack is locked in an empty cell with a former member of the cooking staff. While they attempt to escape, Valerie is forced to have dinner with Krieger, who orders the mercenaries to unleash Max (who has been transformed into a mutant) on Jack and the cook when he sees them on camera trying to escape. After a brief fight, Jack manages to convince Max to reject Krieger's programming. Max then assaults the mercenaries and releases the other mutants.

The mutants, enraged by what Kreiger did to them, attempt to kill all of the humans on the island. After taking heavy casualties, half of the surviving mercenaries realize Krieger is insane, abandon him, and team up with Jack to escape the island. The other half of the mercenaries remain loyal to Krieger and attempt to help him regain control. The two sides begin to fight each other and the mutants at the same time.

As the battle goes on, Max is shot and killed by Krieger's sadistic female second-in-command Katia, while the mercenaries are quickly overwhelmed and slaughtered by the mutants. This leaves only Krieger, Katia, Jack, Valerie, and the cook alive. While trying to find Valerie, Jack is surprised by Katia, who tries to kill him as well. After dealing with her, he finds Valerie and tells her the truth of what happened to Max. The cook, Jack, and Valerie hijack a boat at the docks. When Krieger shows up, expecting to find a boat to get off the island, he finds none waiting for him. He turns around and screams as the screen fades to black.

The film ends with Jack in a relationship with Valerie, having obtained a new boat so he can continue to work as a skipper; he also hires the cook to join his crew. Valerie, who turns out to be an undercover CIA agent, continues her work for the agency while traveling with Jack.

Cast

Production
Uwe Boll gained the rights to a Far Cry movie from Crytek, purportedly before the game was released. In an October 2006 interview, Uwe Boll said that production on Far Cry would begin in May 2007. The film was released on the second of October, 2008, in Germany.

Reception
Far Cry received negative reviews with most critics saying it does the games no justice. IGN gave the film a 3 out of 10 and said "Perhaps one day game companies will learn to be more particular about the directors they choose to realize their products on the big screen. Fans of the game, and fans of movies in general, would be wise to avoid this one at all costs. Unless, of course, your purpose is to mock."

Reboot
In 2013 Variety reported that Ubisoft was developing another Far Cry film (based on the video game Far Cry 3) along with a Watch Dogs and Raving Rabbids film, this time, produced by Ubisoft Motion Pictures, however, it was later adapted into a Netflix series instead.

See also
 List of films based on video games

References

External links
 
 

2008 films
2008 science fiction action films
German science fiction action films
Live-action films based on video games
Films directed by Uwe Boll
Canadian science fiction action films
English-language Canadian films
2000s English-language films
English-language German films
Films shot in Vancouver
Films set on islands
Far Cry
Works based on Ubisoft video games
Brightlight Pictures films
Biopunk films
2000s Canadian films
2000s German films